The island of Cyprus was an overseas possession of the Republic of Venice from 1489, when the independent Kingdom of Cyprus ended, until 1570–71, when the island was conquered by the Ottoman Empire.

History

Acquisition
Venice for centuries wanted to control Cyprus and Venetian merchants worked on the island beginning in 1000 AD, when the Venetian (commercial and military) expansion in the eastern Mediterranean had started.

In 1468, James II of Cyprus of the house of Lusignan became King of Cyprus. In 1468, he chose Catherine Cornaro (born in Venice from the noble family of the "Corner") as his wife and Queen consort of Cyprus. The King's choice was extremely pleasing to the Republic of Venice, as it could henceforth secure the commercial rights and other privileges of Venice in Cyprus. They married in Venice on 30 July 1468 by proxy when she was 14 years old.

James died soon after the wedding due to a sudden illness and, according to his will, Caterina, who at the time was pregnant, acted as regent. She became monarch when their infant son James died of malaria in August 1474 before his first birthday.

The Kingdom of Cyprus had long since declined, and had been a tributary state of the Egyptian Mamluks since 1426. Under Caterina, who ruled Cyprus from 1474 to 1489, the island was controlled by Venetian merchants, and on 14 March 1489 she was forced to abdicate and sell the administration of the country to the Republic of Venice.

According to George Boustronios, "On 14 February, the Queen dressed in black and accompanied by the Barons and their ladies, set off on horseback. Six knights held her horse's reins. From the moment she left Nicosia, her eyes kept streaming with tears. Upon her departure, the whole population was bewailing." So, the last Crusader state became a colony of Venice, and as compensation, Catherine was allowed to retain the title of Queen and was made the Sovereign Lady of Asolo, a county in the Venetian terraferma in northern Italy, in 1489.

The bulk of Venetian Cyprus was composed of Greek Orthodox peasants who were oppressed by the Latin ruling class (related to the former Lusignan kings), and it was estimated that there were some fifty thousand serfs. Venice favored Catholicism, which thus enjoyed a huge increase in followers: there were some problems because of this with the local Greek Orthodox priests.

Contest with the Ottoman Empire

Throughout the period of Venetian rule, Ottoman Turks raided and attacked the peoples of Cyprus at will. The Greek population of Cyprus were given weapons by their Venetian rulers and fought the attacking Ottomans.

In 1489, the first year of Venetian control, Turks attacked the Karpass Peninsula, pillaging and taking captives to be sold into slavery. In 1539 the Turkish fleet attacked and destroyed Limassol. Fearing the ever-expanding Ottoman Empire, the Venetians had fortified Famagusta, Nicosia, and Kyrenia, but most other cities were easy prey.

In 1489, when Cyprus came under Venetian rule, Nicosia became their administrative center. The Venetian governors saw it as a necessity for all the cities of Cyprus to be fortified due to the Ottoman threat. In 1567 Venetians built the new fortifications of Nicosia, which are well-preserved until today, demolishing the old walls built by the Franks as well as other important buildings of the Frankish era including the King's Palace, other private palaces and churches and monasteries of both Orthodox and Latin Christians. The new walls took the shape of a star with eleven bastions: the design of the bastion was more suitable for artillery and a better control for the defenders. The walls had three gates: the "Kyrenia Gate" to the north, the "Paphos Gate" to the west, and the "Famagusta Gate" to the east. The river Pedieos flowed through the Venetian walled city, but in 1567 it was diverted outside into the newly built moat for strategic reasons, due to the expected Ottoman attack.

The Venetians even modified Kyrenia Castle to meet the threat that the use of gunpowder and cannons posed. The castle's royal quarters and three of its four thin and elegant Frankish towers were demolished and replaced by thickset circular towers that could better withstand cannon fire.

Indeed, commercial activity under the Republic of Venice turned Famagusta into a place where merchants and ship owners led lives of luxury. The belief that people's wealth could be measured by the churches they built inspired these merchants to have churches built in varying styles. These churches, which still exist, were the reason Famagusta came to be known as "the district of churches". The development of the town focused on the social lives of the wealthy people and was centered upon the "Lusignan palace", the Cathedral, the Square and the harbour.

In the summer of 1570, the Turks struck again, but this time with a full-scale invasion rather than a raid. About 60,000 troops, including cavalry and artillery, under the command of Lala Kara Mustafa Pasha landed unopposed near Limassol on July 2, 1570, and laid siege to Nicosia. The city fell on September 9, 1570; 20,000 Nicosians were put to death, and every church, public building, and palace was looted. Word of the massacre spread, and a few days later Mustafa took Kyrenia without having to fire a shot. The Venetian walls of Nicosia were incomplete and not useful in stopping this powerful Ottoman army, which was reinforced in the last months of 1570.

Siege of Famagusta

 
However, Famagusta, strengthened by Cyprus' governor Astorre Baglioni, resisted with the Siege of Famagusta and put up a strong defense that lasted from September 1570 until August 1571.

On 15 September 1570, the Turkish cavalry appeared before the last Venetian stronghold in Cyprus, Famagusta. At this point already, overall Venetian losses (including the local population) were estimated by contemporaries at 56,000 killed or taken prisoner. The Venetian defenders of Famagusta numbered about 8,500 men with 90 artillery pieces and were commanded by Marco Antonio Bragadin. They held out for 11 months against a force that came to number more than 200,000 men, with 145 guns, providing the time needed by the Pope to cobble together an anti-Ottoman league from the reluctant Christian European states.

The Turks lost some 52,000 men in five major assaults in early 1571, until in summer the Venetians, despairing to receive any rescue from the homeland and on request from the local starving civilians, decided to surrender. In July 1571 the Turks eventually breached the fortifications of Famagusta and their forces broke into the citadel, being repulsed only at the cost of heavy losses. With provisions and ammunition running out, his soldiers able to fight reduced to just seven hundred and no sign of relief from Venice, on August 1 Bragadin asked for terms of surrender. The Turkish commander, Lala Kara Mustafa Pasha, agreed to allow the survivors to safely return to Crete, but he did not keep his word: he was enraged because of his older son's death attacking so few Venetian defenders. There followed a massacre of all Christians still in the city, with Bragadin himself most brutally abused.

From a military point of view, the besieged garrison's perseverance required a massive effort by the Ottoman Turks, who were so heavily committed that they were unable to redeploy in time when the Holy League built up the fleet later victorious against the Muslim power at the Battle of Lepanto (1571): this was the legacy of Bragadin and his Venetians to Christianity, as Theodore Mommsen wrote. Historians to this day debate just why Venice did not send help to Bragadin from Souda, Crete. It is alleged that some Venetians thought about putting their limited military assets to better use in the forthcoming clash, already in sight, which would climax in the Battle of Lepanto.

The fall of Famagusta marked the beginning of the Ottoman period in Cyprus. It is noteworthy to pinpoint that this is the historical setting to Shakespeare's Othello, the play's title character being the commander of the Venetian garrison defending Cyprus against the Ottomans.

List of governors
The year given is the year of appointment.

Lieutenants (luogotenenti)

1489 – Francesco Barbarigo
1491 – Girolamo Pesaro
1493 – Giovanni Donato
1495 – Andrea Barbarigo
1497 – Cosimo Pasqualigo
1500 – Andrea Venier
1501 – Nicola Priuli
1503 – Pietro Balbi
1505 – Cristoforo Moro
1507 – Lorenzo Giustiniani
1509 – Nicola Pesaro
1511 – Paolo Gradenigo
1514 – Donato Marcello
1516 – Fantino Michiel
1518 – Alvise d'Armer
1519 – Sebastiano Moro
1522 – Giacomo Badoer
1523 – Domenico Capello
1525 – Donato di Lezze
1527 – Silvestro Minio
1529 – Francesco Bragadino
1531 – Marcantonio Trevisan
1533 – Stefano Tiepolo
1535 – Giovanni Moro
1536 – Domenico da Mosto
1539 – Francesco Badoer
1541 – Cristoforo Capello
1543 – Luigi Riva
1545 – Carlo Capello
1547 – Vittorio Barbarigo
1548 – Salvatore Michiel
1550 – Alessandro Contarini
1551 – Francesco Capello
1553 – Marco Grimani
1555 – Giambattista Donato
1557 – Giovanni Renier
1559 – Giovanni Barbaro
1562 – Pietro Navagero
1563 – David Trevisan
1565 – Marino Gradenigo (died before arriving in Cyprus)
1565 – Pandolfo Guoro
1566 – Nicola Querini
1566 – Agostino Barbarigo
1567 – Nicola Dandolo
1569 – Sebastiano Venier
1570 – Daniele Barbarigo (never arrived in Cyprus)

Counsellors (consiglieri)

1490 – Francesco Leone
1492 – Bartolomeo Minio
1493 – Lorenzo Contarini
1494 – Ludovico Moro
1494 – Roberto Venier
1495 – Dona Rimondo
1496 – Ambrogio Contarini
1497 – Bartolomeo Pesaro
1498 – Pietro Moro
1500 – Nicola Pisani
1501 – Nicola Corner
1502 – Nicola Pesaro
1503 – Antonio Morosini
1504 – Girolamo Marin
1505 – Giacomo Badoer
1506 – Pietro Basadonna
1507 – Ludovico Contarini
1507 – Pietro Loredan
1508 – Donato di Lezze
1508 – Alvise d'Armer
1510 – Antonio Bon
1510 – Nicola Corner
1512 – Moise Leone (died before arriving in Cyprus)
1512 – Marino Gritti
1513 – Nicola Michiel
1514 – Giovanni Dolfin
1515 – Sebastiano Badoer
1515 – Ludovico Corner
1516 – Andrea Pesaro
1516 – Francesco Malipiero
1519 – Pietro Balbi
1521 – Sebastiano Foscarini
1522 – Domenico da Mosto
1523 – Pietro Venier
1524 – Marcantonio Trevisan
1526 – Marco Querini
1526 – Girolamo Marcello
1531 – Secondo Pesaro
1531 – Bernardo Venier
1533 – Marcantonio Calbo
1533 – Marco Balbi
1534 – Marcantonio Corner
1535 – Francesco Bembo
1536 – Sebastiano Querini
1537 – Marco Barbo
1538 – Antonio Calbo
1538 – Giambattista Donato
1540 – Michele Tron
1541 – Fantino Dolfin
1542 – Anzolo Nadal
1543 – Bernardo Pesaro
1544 – Gaspard Bembo
1545 – Gaspard Contarini
1546 – Bernardo Marcello
1547 – Andrea Contarini
1548 – Marco Pesaro
1549 – Maffeo Soranzo
1549 – Zaccaria Barbaro
1551 – Ludovico Ponte
1551 – Alessandro Zorzi
1553 – Girolamo Navagero
1554 – Antonio Zane
1555 – Nicola Mula
1556 – Ludovico Minotto
1557 – Giovanni Bragandino
1558 – Ludovico Capello
1558 – Lorenzo Pisani
1558 – Bernardo Morosini
1560 – Bernardino Bellegno
1561 – Girolamo Malipiero
1562 – Marco Cicogna
1563 – Antonio Zorzi (died before arriving in Cyprus)
1564 – Benedetto Contarini
1564 – Giacomo Ghisi
1565 – Nicola Loredan
1566 – Benedetto Mula
1568 – Pietro Pisani
1568 – Marcantonio Priuli

Notes

Bibliography
 Birtachas, Stathis, Βενετική Κύπρος (1489–1571): Οι Εκθέσεις των αξιωματούχων του ανώτατου διοικητικού σχήματος της κτήσης / Venetian Cyprus: The Reports by the dominion’s supreme administrative officials, Thessaloniki: Epikentro, 2019. [bilingual edition]
 Birtachas, Stathis, Κοινωνία, πολιτισμός και διακυβέρνηση στο βενετικό Κράτος της Θάλασσας: Το παράδειγμα της Κύπρου [Society, Culture and Government in the Venetian Maritime State: The case of Cyprus], Thessaloniki: Vanias, 2011. [in Greek]
 
 Campolieti, Giuseppe. Caterina Cornaro: regina di Cipro, signora di Asolo Ed. Camunia. Milano, 1987.
 Diehl, Charles. La Repubblica di Venezia. Newton & Compton. Roma, 2004.  
 Foglietta, U. The Sieges of Nicosia and Famagusta. London: Waterlow, 1903.
 Romanin, Samuele. Storia documentata di Venezia, Pietro Naratovich tipografo editore. Venezia, 1853.

 
Cyprus
States and territories established in 1489
States and territories disestablished in 1571
1489 establishments in Europe
15th-century establishments in the Republic of Venice
1571 disestablishments in the Republic of Venice